Ghofrane Belkhir (born 11 August 2001) is a Tunisian weightlifter. She won the gold medal in the women's 55kg event at the 2021 World Weightlifting Championships held in Tashkent, Uzbekistan. She also won the gold medal in the 58kg event at the 2018 Summer Youth Olympics held in Buenos Aires, Argentina. Belkhir broke the world record for the snatch, clean and jerk, and total in the women's 59-kilogram class weightlifting event at the 5th International Solidarity Weightlifting Championship in Cairo, Egypt in December 2018.

Career 

At the 2018 Mediterranean Games held in Tarragona, Spain, she won the gold medal in the 63kg Snatch event and the bronze medal in the 63kg Clean & Jerk event. At the 2019 African Weightlifting Championships in Cairo, Egypt, she competed in the women's 59kg event where she failed to register a successful result in the Snatch event.

In 2021, she won the gold medal in the women's 59kg event at the Junior World Weightlifting Championships held in Tashkent, Uzbekistan. She won the gold medal in the women's 59kg Clean & Jerk event at the 2022 Mediterranean Games held in Oran, Algeria.

Achievements

References

External links 

 

Living people
2001 births
Place of birth missing (living people)
Tunisian female weightlifters
Weightlifters at the 2018 Summer Youth Olympics
Youth Olympic gold medalists for Tunisia
Competitors at the 2018 Mediterranean Games
Competitors at the 2022 Mediterranean Games
Mediterranean Games gold medalists for Tunisia
Mediterranean Games medalists in weightlifting
African Weightlifting Championships medalists
World Weightlifting Championships medalists
21st-century Tunisian women